Marcelo Patricio Nicola Virginio (born May 12, 1971) is an Argentine-Italian former professional basketball player and a current coach. A very versatile power forward, he was a regular member of the Argentine national basketball team, and competed many years in the EuroLeague.

Professional career
Nicola was selected 50th overall in the 1993 NBA draft, but remained in Europe and won the Saporta Cup in 1996 with Taugrés, the team in which he made his debut in the Spanish ACB League. He played his best basketball for Benetton Treviso, with which he lifted another Saporta Cup trophy in 1999, and he was selected to the All-EuroLeague Second Team for the Euroleague 2001–02 season. He also made it to the Euroleague 2002–03 final game.

National team career
Nicola was a member of the Argentine national basketball team. With the junior national team of Argentina, he played at the 1993 FIBA Under-21 World Cup. With Argentina's senior men's national team, he played at the 1994 FIBA World Championship, the 1996 Olympics, and the 1998 FIBA World Championship.

Coaching career
In 2012, Nicola started his coach career as assistant coach in Liga ACB team UCAM Murcia. In 2014, after the sacking of Óscar Quintana, he was named the head coach of the team.

In February 2015, he became the head coach of Lietuvos rytas Vilnius team (Lithuania) after Virginijus Šeškus release. On November 16, 2015, it was announced that Nicola was fired from Lietuvos rytas Vilnius due to poor results.

In the beginning of 2016–17 season he joined his former coach Simone Pianigiani at the Israeli club Hapoel Jerusalem.

On 8 September 2017, Nicola came back to Baskonia, where he played six years, for being the coordinator of the youth teams of the club.

References

External links 
Euroleague.net Profile

NBA Draft Profile
Spanish League Profile 
Italian League Profile 

1971 births
Living people
Argentine basketball coaches
Argentine emigrants to Italy
Argentine expatriate basketball people in Italy
Argentine expatriate basketball people in Spain
Argentine expatriate sportspeople in Greece
Argentine expatriate sportspeople in Ukraine
Argentine men's basketball players
Argentine people of Italian descent
Basketball players at the 1996 Summer Olympics
BC Kyiv players
FC Barcelona Bàsquet players
Greek Basket League players
Houston Rockets draft picks
Italian basketball coaches
Italian expatriate basketball people in Spain
Italian men's basketball players
Liga ACB head coaches
Liga ACB players
Mens Sana Basket players
Olympic basketball players of Argentina
Pallacanestro Reggiana players
Pallacanestro Treviso players
Panathinaikos B.C. players
People from Rafaela
Power forwards (basketball)
Saski Baskonia players
Small forwards
1994 FIBA World Championship players
1998 FIBA World Championship players
United States Basketball League players
Sportspeople from Santa Fe Province